Krisch is a surname. Notable people with this name include:
 (born 1954), German jazz musician
Jacob Krisch, American football player for 2014 Minnesota Golden Gophers football team
Kevin Krisch, Austrian footballer for First Vienna FC
Jean Krisch (born 1939), American physicist
Johannes Krisch (born 1966), Austrian actor
 (born 1974), German rower
Nico Krisch (born 1972), German legal scholar

See also
Kříše (German: Krisch), a former Czech village in what is now Břasy
Krish (disambiguation)
Krischan Related surname of German origin.